Stephanie Ortwig (born 28 January 1973) is a retired German swimmer who won a gold medal in the 4 × 200 m freestyle relay at the 1991 World Aquatics Championships. She also competed at the 1988 Summer Olympics and finished seventh in the 200 m, 400 m and 4 × 200 m freestyle events. Between 1988 and 1990 she won seven national titles in the 200–800 m freestyle disciplines. In 1988 she was selected as the German Junior Athlete of the Year.

References

1973 births
Living people
Olympic swimmers of West Germany
Swimmers at the 1988 Summer Olympics
German female freestyle swimmers
German female swimmers
World Aquatics Championships medalists in swimming